In British town planning, the green belt is a policy for controlling urban growth. The term, coined by Octavia Hill in 1875, refers to a ring of countryside where urbanisation will be resisted for the foreseeable future, maintaining an area where agriculture, forestry and outdoor leisure can be expected to prevail. The fundamental aim of green belt policy is to prevent urban sprawl by keeping land permanently open, and consequently the most important attribute of green belts is their openness.

The Metropolitan Green Belt around London was first proposed by the Greater London Regional Planning Committee in 1935. The Town and Country Planning Act 1947 then allowed local authorities to include green belt proposals in their development plans. In 1955, Minister of Housing Duncan Sandys encouraged local authorities around the country to consider protecting land around their towns and cities by the formal designation of clearly defined green belts.

Green belt policy has been criticised for reducing the amount of land available for building and therefore pushing up house prices, as 70% of the cost of building new houses is the purchase of the land (up from 25% in the late 1950s).

England and Wales

The government formerly set out its policies and principles towards green belts in England and Wales in Planning Policy Guidance Note 2: Green Belts, but this planning guidance was superseded by the National Planning Policy Framework (NPPF) in March 2012. Planning authorities are strongly urged to follow the NPPF's detailed advice when considering whether to permit additional development in the green belt. In the green belt there is a general presumption against inappropriate development, unless very special circumstances can be demonstrated to show that the benefits of the development will outweigh the harm caused to the green belt. The NPPF sets out what would constitute appropriate development in the green belt.

According to the NPPF, there are five stated purposes of including land within the green belt:
To check the unrestricted sprawl of large built-up areas
To prevent neighbouring towns from merging into one another
To assist in safeguarding the countryside from encroachment
To preserve the setting and special character of historic towns
To assist in urban regeneration, by encouraging the recycling of derelict and other urban land.

Once an area of land has been defined as green belt, the stated opportunities and benefits include:
Providing opportunities for access to the open countryside for the urban population
Providing opportunities for outdoor sport and outdoor recreation near urban areas
The retention of attractive landscapes and the enhancement of landscapes, near to where people live
Improvement of damaged and derelict land around towns
The securing of nature conservation interests
The retention of land in agricultural, forestry and related uses.

England
The area designated as green belt land in England as at 31 March 2010 was estimated at 1,639,560 hectares, about 13 per cent of the land area.

The distribution of green belt designated land by region of England as at 31 March in 2009, 2010, 2011, 2012, 2013, 2014 and 2018 was as follows:

Year-on-year changes reflect items included in the following notes:

2011
 between March 2010 and March 2011, boundary changes in three authorities (Enfield, Slough and Vale of White Horse) resulted in a small increase (less than 5 hectares) in the total area of green belt
 over the longer term, since these statistics were first compiled for 1997, there has been an increase in the area of green belt after taking account of the re-designation of some green belt as part of the New Forest National Park in 2005

2012
 overall there has been a decrease of 130 hectares from the revised 2010 to 2011 green belt, due to three authorities who have adopted new plans in which they have changed the boundaries of the green belt; this represents a decrease of less than 0.01% in the total green belt area

2013
 overall there has been a slight decrease of 390 hectares (around 0.02%) in area of green belt between 2011/12 and 2012/13; in 2012/13, four authorities adopted new plans which resulted in the decrease in the overall area of green belt compared to 2011 to 2012
 the revised 2011 to 2012 green belt in England is estimated at 1,639,480 hectares, this is a slight increase of 70 hectares on the estimated 2011 to 2012 green belt area of 1,639,410 hectares published in November 2012; this change is due to a correction of the area of obe local authority's green belt boundary

2014
 overall there has been a decrease of 540 hectares (around 0.03%) in area of green belt between 2012/13 and 2013/14; in 2013/14, three authorities adopted new plans which resulted in the decrease in the overall area of green belt compared to 2012 to 2013

To 2018
 overall there has been a reduction in green belt of 9900 hectares since 2014.

The total area of green belt land in England since 2003 was as follows:

As well as any underlying re-designations, changes in green belt area are explained in part by alterations in land designation by local authorities, and may also be influenced by improvements with measurement associated with digital mapping. Note that from 2006, estimates exclude the area of Green Belt land in New Forest DC and Test Valley BC (47,300 hectares) which were designated as New Forest National Park in 2005.

Wales
Wales has one green belt, between the cities of Cardiff and Newport.

Northern Ireland
Northern Ireland has 30 green belt areas, accounting for approximately 226,600 hectares, about 16 percent of its total area.

Scotland
Green belt policy in Scotland is set out in Scottish Planning Policy (SPP) 21, published by the Scottish Government in February 2010. On 29 November, the Government published "Green Belt Policy in Scotland 10/85"

As of 2010 Scotland had 10 green belt areas: Aberdeen, Ayr, Clackmannanshire, East Lothian, Edinburgh, Falkirk and Grangemouth, Greater Glasgow, Midlothian and Stirling. There are also plans for green belts around Dunfermline, Perth and St Andrews.

The Scottish Government is clear that the purpose of green belt designation in the development plan as part of the settlement strategy for an area is to:
 direct planned growth to the most appropriate locations and support regeneration,
 protect and enhance the quality, character, landscape setting and identity of towns and cities, and
 protect and give access to open space within and around towns and cities

However, the Scottish Government recognises that certain types of development might actually promote and support appropriate rural diversification:
 Development associated with agriculture, including the re-use of historic agricultural buildings,
 Woodland and forestry, including community woodlands,
 Horticulture, including market gardening and directly connected retailing,
 Recreational uses that are compatible with an agricultural or natural setting, and
 Essential infrastructure such as electronic communications infrastructure and electricity grid connections

The Government requires that locally established green belt plans: maintain the identity of a city by the clearly establishing physical boundaries and preventing coalescence; provide countryside for recreation of denizens; and maintain the landscape setting of the city in question. In its Planning Policy (129), the Scottish Government states that:
“All public bodies, including planning authorities, have a duty to further the conservation of biodiversity under the Nature Conservation (Scotland) Act 2004, and this should be reflected in development plans and development management decisions. Biodiversity is important because it provides natural services and products that we rely on, is an important element of sustainable development and makes an essential contribution to Scotland's economy and cultural heritage.”

History

The term emerged from continental Europe where broad boulevards were increasingly used to separate new development from the centre of historic towns; most notably the Ringstraße in Vienna. Various proposals were put forward from 1890 onwards but the first to garner widespread support was put forward by the London Society in its "Development Plan of Greater London" 1919. Alongside the CPRE they lobbied for a continuous belt (of up to two miles wide) to prevent urban sprawl, beyond which new development could occur.

Implementation of the notion dated from Herbert Morrison's 1934 leadership of the London County Council. It was first formally proposed by the Greater London Regional Planning Committee in 1935, "to provide a reserve supply of public open spaces and of recreational areas and to establish a green belt or girdle of open space". It was again included in an advisory Greater London Plan prepared by Patrick Abercrombie in 1944 (which sought a belt of up to six miles wide). However, it was some 14 years before the elected local authorities responsible for the area around London had all defined the area on scaled maps with some precision (encouraged by Duncan Sandys to designate a belt of some 7–10 miles wide).

The motives for a green belt around London were not just environmental, Frank Pick the CEO of the London Passenger Transport Board made an economic case; he believed that London Underground had a finite potential capacity which would be breached by the growth of the city's population and overall physical size.. Pick presented this case to the Barlow Commission (Royal Commission on the Geographical Distribution of the Industrial Population), arguing that if London’s radius grew beyond 12–15 miles, the capital’s commuter infrastructure could not cope in financial or capacity terms, to the detriment of city's overall economy. He instead made the case for a number of economically self-sufficient new towns beyond a new green belt.

New provisions for compensation in the Town and Country Planning Act 1947 allowed local authorities around the country to incorporate green belt proposals in their first development plans. The codification of Green Belt policy and its extension to areas other than London came with the historic Circular 42/55 inviting local planning authorities to consider the establishment of green belts. This decision was made in tandem with the 1946 New Towns Act, which sought to depopulate urban centres in the South East of England and accommodate people in new settlements elsewhere. Green belt could therefore be designated by local authorities without worry that it would come into conflict with pressure from population growth.

As the outward growth of London was seen to be firmly repressed, residents owning properties further from the built-up area also campaigned for this policy of urban restraint, partly to safeguard their own investments but often invoking an idealised scenic/rustic argument which laid the blame for most social ills upon urban influences. In mid-1971, for example, the government decided to extend the Metropolitan Green Belt northwards to include almost all of Hertfordshire. The Metropolitan Green Belt now covers parts of 68 different Districts or Boroughs.

Since 1955 London's green belt has extended significantly, stretching some 35 miles out in places. London's green belt now covers an area of 516,000 hectares, an area broadly three times larger than that of London itself. The London Society began debate about the city's green belt in 2014 with publication of a report entitled "Green Sprawl". Other organisations, including the Planning Officers Society, have since responded with specific calls for a review and proposals to balance land release with environmental protection. In 2016, the London Society and the All Party Parliamentary Group (APPG) for London's Planning and Built Environment published plans for a 'green web' to replace the green belt in some locations. The ambition is to create a "multifunctional green infrastructure landscape" in which new-build and publicly accessible natural space sat side by side.

Research undertaken by the London School of Economics in 2016 suggests that by 1979, the area covered by green belt in England comprised 721,500 hectares, and by 1993, this had been extended to 1,652,310 hectares.

Criticism
Several academics, policy groups and town planning organisations in recent years have criticised the idea and implementation of green belts in the UK. Green belt policy has been attacked as too rigid in the face of new urban and environmental challenges, principally the lack of housing available in many cities in the UK. The policy has been criticised for reducing the amount of land available for building and therefore pushing up house prices, as 70% of the cost of building new houses is the purchase of the land (up from 25% in the late 1950s). It has also been claimed that areas of green belt can be of unremarkable environmental quality, and may not be well managed or provide the recreational opportunities originally envisaged.

Environmental
The Town and Country Planning Association, an organisation heavily involved in initiating the concept several decades previously, published a policy statement in 2002, which proposed a more flexible policy which would allow the introduction of green wedge and strategic gap policies rather than green belts, and so permit the expansion of some urban areas. In October 2007, Sir Martin Doughty, then Chair of Natural England, argued for a review of green belts, saying: "The time has come for a greener green belt. We need a 21st century solution to England's housing needs which puts in place a network of green wedges, gaps and corridors, linking the natural environment and people.". Similarly, the London Society published a comprehensive history of the green belt (as it emerged in the first part of the twentieth century) in 2014. Authored by the influential English urbanist Jonathan Manns, this called for a "move away from the simplistic and naïve idea that countryside is a sacrosanct patchwork of medieval hedgerows and towards an empirically informed position which once more recognises housing as a need to be met in locations with appropriate environmental capacity".

Effect on house prices

The Economist has criticised green belt policy, saying that unless more houses are built through reforming planning laws and releasing green belt land, then housing space will need to be rationed out. In March 2014, it was noted that if general inflation had risen as fast as housing prices had since 1971, a chicken would cost £51; and that Britain is "building less homes today than at any point since the 1920s". According to the Institute of Economic Affairs, there is "overwhelming empirical evidence that that planning restrictions have a substantial impact on housing costs" and are the main reason why housing is two and a half times more expensive in 2011 than it was in 1975. The free market Adam Smith Institute is a particular critic of the green belt, and has claimed that removing the green belt from land within ten minutes walk of a railway station would release enough land to build 1 million homes.

In response to the claims made by the Adams Smith Institute, the Royal Town Planning Institute commissioned the Building In The Green Belt?  report to look into the commuting patterns in London's metropolitan green belt. The study found only 7.4% of commuters, who lived near a railway station actually travelled to London by train on a regular basis with the vast majority (72%) travelling by private vehicle to jobs in their hometown and to other places not within London. Thus the proposal put forward in the Adam Smith report could result in 3.96 to 7.45 million additional car journeys per week on already congested roads around London. CPRE say it is a myth to connect green belts to rising house prices, since there is no clear difference in house prices between cities with green belts and cities without them, and both land and house prices are inflated by other factors such as investment.

Lewis Abbott has identified green belt barriers to urban expansion as one of several major protectionist political-economic barriers to house building with negative effects on the supply, cost/prices, and quality of new homes. (The others include new housing development taxes and quasi-taxes; political discrimination against particular classes of new housing supplier, household consumer, and housing product; and controls on housing technical-product development – in particular, the blocking of innovative low-cost house building using new materials and production technologies). Abbott argues that the greenbelts actually defeat their own stated objective of saving the countryside and open spaces. By preventing existing towns and cities from extending normally and organically, they result in more land-extensive housing developments further out – i.e., the establishment beyond the greenbelts of new communities with lower building densities, their own built infrastructure and other facilities, and greater dependence on cars and commuting, etc. Meanwhile, valuable urban green space and brownfield sites best suited to industry and commerce are lost in existing conurbations as more and more new housing is crammed into them.

Commentators such as Alan Evans and Tom Papworth have called for outright abolition of green belts, principally on the grounds that by inhibiting the free use of land they restrict home ownership.

However, in England, where 65% of people are property-owners who benefit from scarcity of building land, the concept of "green belt" has become entrenched as a fundamental part of government policy, and the possibility of reviewing boundaries is often viewed with considerable hostility by neighbouring communities and their elected representatives.

Related concepts
The general concept of "green belt" has evolved in recent years to encompass "Greenspace" and "Greenstructure", taking into account urban greenspace, an important aspect of sustainable development in the 21st century. However, while in general  these concepts are quite distinct in the UK from the green belt as a statutory development plan designation, an exception occurs in London where land may be designated as "Metropolitan Open Land" (MOL). Areas of MOL are subject to the same planning restrictions as the green belt while lying within the urban area. In 2005, the European Commission's COST Action C11 (COST European Cooperation in Science and Technology) undertook in-depth city case studies into cities across 15 European countries. Sheffield was one such case study city for the UK. Conclusions were published in "Case studies in Greenstructure Planning".

See also
Environmental racism in Europe
Green belt
Intergenerational equity
London commuter belt
NIMBY
Smart growth
Urban growth boundary

References

External links
Interactive Map of England's green belts
Planning Policy Guidance Note 2 for England & Wales
 SPP21 for Scotland
For topical summaries of discussions about the possible release of green belt land for various developments or urbanisation: 
For an academic bibliography: 
For views critical of green belt policy: 
Campaign to Protect Rural England
Oxford Green Belt Network
London Society

Environment of the United Kingdom
Town and country planning in the United Kingdom
Urban society in the United Kingdom